Coto is one of 54 parishes in Cangas del Narcea, a municipality within the province and autonomous community of Asturias, in northern Spain.

Villages
 Abanceña
 Casares
 Celviriz
 Cerveriz
 El Valle del Coto
 El Viso (El Visu)
 Escrita
 Folgueras (Folgueiras)
 San Damías (Sandamiás)

References

Parishes in Cangas del Narcea